The men's 500 metres in short track speed skating at the 2006 Winter Olympics began on 22 February, with the final on 25 February, at the Torino Palavela.

Records
Prior to this competition, the existing world and Olympic records were as follows:

No new world and Olympic records were set during this competition.

Results

Heats
The first round was held on 22 February. There were seven heats of three or four skaters each, with the top two finishers and the two fastest third-place skaters moving on to the quarterfinals.

Heat 1

Quarterfinals
The top two finishers in each of the four quarterfinals advanced to the semifinals.

Quarterfinal 1

Quarterfinal 2

Quarterfinal 3

Quarterfinal 4

Semifinals
The top two finishers in each of the two semifinals qualified for the A final, while the third and fourth place skaters advanced to the B Final. In the first semifinal, China's Li Jiajun impeded Britain's Jon Eley, resulting in Li's disqualification, while Eley, who finished third in the race, was advanced to the final.

Semifinal 1

Semifinal 2

Finals
The five qualifying skaters competed in Final A, while two other raced for 6th place in Final B.

Final A

Final B

References

Men's short track speed skating at the 2006 Winter Olympics